Blackened Sunrise is the second extended play (EP) by English hard rock band Viking Skull. Recorded in Pennsylvania and California, it was released on 8 September 2007 by Filthy Note in the UK and DRP Records in the US.

Background
The songs included on Blackened Sunrise were recorded during the sessions for Viking Skull's second studio album, Chapter Two, much of which took place in Philadelphia and were funded by drummer Jess Margera. Margera's CKY bandmate, guitarist Chad I Ginsburg, engineered and mixed the material, alongside fellow engineers Phil Nicolo, Cody Cochowski and Tommy Joyner. The EP was originally included for free within orders of Chapter Two placed through CD Baby in 2007. In addition to three songs not included on Chapter Two and an alternate mix of the title track, Blackened Sunrise also includes the music video for the title track, directed by Bam Margera.

Track listing

The music video for "Blackened Sunrise" is also included.

Personnel

Roddy Stone – vocals, guitar, production
Julian "Jules" Cooper – guitar, production
Kevin "Waldie" James – bass, production
Jess Margera – drums, production
Chad I Ginsburg – engineering, mixing
Phil Nicolo – engineering
Cody Cochowski – engineering
Tommy Joyner – engineering
Andrew Alekel – recording
Joel Metzler – recording assistance
Roger Lian – editing
Howie Weinberg – mastering

References

Viking Skull albums
2007 EPs